This list of public art in Roskilde Municipality lists public art in Roskilde Municipality, Denmark.

Overview
Roskilde's most well-known public artwork is the Roskilde Jars on Hestetorvet in front of Roskilde Railway Station. The three five meter high jars were designed by Peter Brandes and presented to the City of Roskilde as a gift on the occasion of its 1,000th anniversary. On  Stændertorvet, the city's largest and most important public square, is a granite fountain built in 1895 which features various symbols from the city's coat of arms in its design. The fountain stands in front of the former city hall which now houses the tourist information office. On the same square in front of the Royal Mansion stands a statue of Hroar and Helge two legendary kings who ruled Denmark from Roskilde in the 6th century. The statue was created by Johan Galster and was the winning entry in a 1933 competition for a new artwork on the City Hall Square. Roskilde commissioned an equestrian statue of Margaret I of Denmark from Anne Marie Carl-Nielsen in the 1890s. She completed the first model in about 1897 but the final project was not completed due to lack of funding. In 2006, the equestrian statue was finally realized based on a plaster model which had been kept in the storages of Roskilde Museum. It now stands at Københavnsvej, opposite the Ro's Torv Shopping Center. A bronze statue of one of Roskilde's most famous natives, Lise Nørgaard, depicting Nørgaard sitting on a bench, is found on Algade, the city's principal pedestrian street. Outside Roskilde Museum stands a Bjørn Nørgaard statue which presents scenes from the Ragnarök legend on its four sides.

List

See also
 Listed buildings in Roskilde Municipality
 List of protected areas of Roskilde Municipality
 List of public art in Copenhagen

References

External links
 Kunst I det fri

Roskilde
Roskilde